Diédougou is a commune in the Cercle of Koutiala in the Sikasso Region of southern Mali. The commune includes 4 villages and covers an area of 147 square kilometers. In the 2009 census it had a population of 4,449. The administrative centre (chef-lieu) is the village of Kouwo which lies 67 km west of Koutiala.

References

External links
.

Communes of Sikasso Region